There is much disagreement within biblical scholarship today over the authorship of the Bible. The majority of scholars believe that most of the books of the Bible are the work of multiple authors and that all have been edited to produce the works known today. The following article outlines the conclusions of the majority of contemporary scholars, along with the traditional views, both Jewish and Christian.

Divine authorship

The rabbis of the Babylonian Talmud held that God wrote the Torah in heaven in letters of black fire on parchment of white fire before the world was created, and that Moses received it by divine dictation. The early Church Fathers agreed that the scriptures were inspired or dictated by God, but not on which writings were scriptural: as a result, the Eastern Orthodox and Roman Catholic churches treat some books (the Apocrypha) as inspired, but the Protestant tradition does not. In the 20th century the vast majority of theologians, both Catholic and Protestant, moved away from the divine dictation model and emphasised the role of the human authors. As a result, even many conservative scholars now accept, for example, that the Book of Isaiah has multiple authors and that 2 Corinthians is two letters joined.

Hebrew Bible
The Hebrew Bible, or Tanakh, is the collection of scriptures making up the Bible used by Judaism; the same books, in a slightly different order, also make up the Protestant version of the Old Testament. The order used here follows the divisions used in Jewish Bibles.

Torah

The first division of the Jewish Bible is the Torah, meaning "Instruction" or "Law"; in scholarly literature it is frequently called by its Greek name, the Pentateuch ("five scrolls"). It is the group of five books made up of Genesis, Exodus, Leviticus, Numbers and Deuteronomy and stands first in all versions of the Christian Old Testament.

According to Rabbinic tradition the five books of the Torah were written by Moses, with the exception of the last eight verses of Deuteronomy which describe his death. Most Jews and Christians believed Mosaic authorship until the 17th century. Today, the majority of scholars agree that the Pentateuch does not have a single author, and that its composition took place over centuries.

Genesis, Exodus, Leviticus and Numbers
From the late 19th century there was a consensus among scholars around the documentary hypothesis, which suggests that the first four books (Genesis, Exodus, Leviticus, Numbers) were created by combining four originally independent documents, known as the Jahwist, the Elohist, the Deuteronomist, and the Priestly sources. This approach has since seen various revisions, yet while the identification of distinctive Deuteronomistic and Priestly theologies and vocabularies remains widespread, they are used to form new approaches suggesting that the books were combined gradually over time by the slow accumulation of "fragments" of text, or that a basic text was "supplemented" by later authors/editors. At the same time there has been a tendency to bring the origins of the Pentateuch further forward in time, and the most recent proposals place it in 5th century BCE Judah under the Persian empire.

Deuteronomy

Deuteronomy is treated separately from Genesis, Exodus, Leviticus and Numbers. Its place in the documentary hypothesis is anomalous, as it, unlike the other four, consists of a single "source". The process of its formation probably took several hundred years, from the 8th century to the 6th, and its authors have been variously identified as prophetic circles (because the concerns of Deuteronomy mirror those of the prophets, especially Hosea), Levitical priestly circles (because it stresses the role of the Levites), and wisdom and scribal circles (because it esteems wisdom, and because the treaty-form in which it is written would be best known to scribes). Deuteronomy was later used as the introduction to the comprehensive history of Israel written in the early part of the 6th century, and later still it was detached from the history and used to round off the Pentateuch.

Prophets

Former prophets

The Former Prophets (נביאים ראשונים, Nevi'im Rishonim), make up the first part of the second division of the Hebrew Bible, the Nevi'im, which translates as "Prophets". In Christian Bibles the Book of Ruth, which belongs in the final section of the Hebrew Bible, is inserted between Judges and Samuel.

According to Jewish tradition dating from at least the 2nd century CE, the Book of Joshua was by Joshua, the Book of Judges and the Books of Samuel were by the prophet Samuel (with some passages by the prophets Gad and Nathan), while the two Books of Kings were by Jeremiah. Since 1943 most scholars have accepted Martin Noth's argument that Deuteronomy, Joshua, Judges, Samuel and Kings make up a single work, the so-called "Deuteronomistic history." Noth believed that the history was the work of a single author writing in the time of the Babylonian exile (586–539 BCE). This author/editor took as his starting point an early version of the book of Deuteronomy, which had already been composed during the reign of Josiah (last quarter of the 7th century), selecting, editing and composing it to produce a coherent work. Frank Moore Cross later proposed that an earlier version of the history was composed in Jerusalem in Josiah's time; this first version, Dtr1, was then revised and expanded to create Noth's second edition, or Dtr2. Still later scholars have discovered further layers and further author-editors. In the 1990s some scholars began to question the existence of a Deuteronomistic history and the question of the origin of these books continues to be debated.

Latter prophets

Isaiah

Modern scholars divide the Book of Isaiah into three parts, each with a different origin: "First Isaiah", chapters 1–39, containing the words of the historical 8th century BCE prophet Isaiah and later expansions by his disciples; "Deutero-Isaiah" (chapters 40–55), by an anonymous Jewish author in Babylon near the end of the Babylonian captivity; and "Trito-Isaiah" (chapters 56–66), by anonymous disciples of Deutero-Isaiah in Jerusalem immediately after the return from Babylon (although some scholars suggest that chapters 55–66 were written by Deutero-Isaiah after the fall of Babylon.) This orderly sequence of pre-exilic, exilic and post-exilic material is somewhat misleading, as some scholars note that significant editing appears to have taken place in all three parts.

Jeremiah

Jeremiah lived in the late 7th and early 6th centuries BCE. The Book of Jeremiah presents Baruch ben Neriah as the prophet's companion who writes his words on several occasions, and there has accordingly been much speculation that Baruch could have composed an early edition of the book. In the early 20th century Sigmund Mowinckel identified three types of material in the book, Jeremiah 1–25 (Type A) being the words of Jeremiah himself, the biographic prose material (Type B) by an admirer writing c. 580–480 BCE, and the remainder (Type C) from later periods. There has been considerable debate over Mowinckel's ideas, notably the extent of the Jeremiah material and the role of Baruch, who may have been the author of the Type B material. It is generally agreed that the book has strong connections with the Deuteronomistic layers from the Former Prophets, recapitulating in modern terms the traditional idea that Jeremiah wrote both his own book and the Books of Kings.

Ezekiel

The Book of Ezekiel describes itself as the words of Ezekiel ben-Buzi, a priest living in exile in the city of Babylon between 593 and 571 BCE. The various manuscripts, however, differ markedly from each other, and it is clear that the book has been subjected to extensive editing. While Ezekiel himself may have been responsible for some of this revision, there is general agreement that the book as we have it today is the product of a highly educated priestly circle that owed allegiance to the historical Ezekiel and was closely associated with the Temple.

Minor Prophets or Book of the Twelve 

The Minor Prophets are one book in the Hebrew Bible, and many (though not all) modern scholars agree that the Book of the Twelve underwent a process of editing which resulted in a coherent collection. This process is believed to have reached its final form in the Persian period (538–332 BCE), although there is disagreement over whether this was early or late. For the individual books, scholars usually assume that there exists an original core of prophetic tradition which can be attributed to the figure after whom the book is named. The noteworthy exception is the Book of Jonah, an anonymous work containing no prophetic oracles, probably composed in the Hellenistic period (332–167 BCE).

Writings

Psalms

While a number of the Psalms bear headings which seem to identify their authors, these are probably the result of the need to find a significant identification in tradition. The individual psalms come from widely different periods: "some ... presuppose a reigning king and an established cult in the Temple; others clearly presuppose and mention the events of the Exile."

Job

The unknown author of the Book of Job is unlikely to have written earlier than the 6th century BCE, and the cumulative evidence suggests a post-Exilic date. It contains some 1,000 lines, of which about 750 form the original core.

Proverbs

The Book of Proverbs consists of several collections taken from various sources. Verses 10:1–22:16 are probably the oldest section, with chapters 1–9 being composed as a prologue – there is some question whether this happened before or after the Exile (587 BCE). The remaining collections are probably later, with the book reaching its final form around the 3rd century BCE.

Ruth

The Talmud refers to Samuel as the author of Ruth, but this conflicts with several details inside the book. It has been proposed that the anonymous author was a woman, or if a man then one who took women's issues seriously. The book is largely a unity, although the genealogy of David appears to be a later addition.

Song of Songs (Song of Solomon)

The Song of Songs was traditionally attributed to Solomon, but modern scholars date it around the 3rd century BCE. Scholars still debate whether it is a single unified work (and therefore from a single author), or more in the nature of an anthology.

Qoheleth/Ecclesiastes

The Book of Ecclesiastes is usually dated to the mid-3rd century BCE. A provenance in Jerusalem is considered likely. The book's claim of Solomon as author is a literary fiction; the author also identifies himself as "Qoheleth", a word of obscure meaning which critics have understood variously as a personal name, a nom de plume, an acronym, and a function; a final self-identification is as "shepherd", a title usually implying royalty.

Lamentations

Lamentations is assigned by tradition to the Prophet Jeremiah; linguistic and theological evidence point to its origin as a distinct book in the 3rd or 2nd century BCE, with the contents having their origin in special mourning observances in Exilic and post-Exilic Jewish communities.

Esther

The Book of Esther was composed in the late 4th or early 3rd century BCE among the Jews of the eastern diaspora. The genre of the book is the novella or short story, and it draws on the themes of wisdom literature; its sources are still unresolved.

Daniel

The Book of Daniel presents itself as the work of a prophet named Daniel who lived during the 6th century BCE; the overwhelming majority of modern scholars date it to the 2nd century BCE. The author, writing in the time of the Maccabees to assure his fellow-Jews that their persecution by the Syrians would come to an end and see them victorious, seems to have constructed his book around the legendary Daniel mentioned in Ezekiel, a figure ranked with Noah and Job for his wisdom and righteousness.

Ezra-Nehemiah

The Book of Ezra and the Book of Nehemiah were originally one work, Ezra-Nehemiah. H.G.M Williamson (1987) proposed three basic stages leading to the final work: (1) composition of the various lists and Persian documents, which he accepts as authentic and therefore the earliest parts of the book; (2) composition of the "Ezra memoir" and "Nehemiah memoir", about 400 BCE; and (3) composition of Ezra 1–6 as the final editor's introduction to the combined earlier texts, about 300 BCE. Lester Grabbe (2003) puts the combination of the two texts Ezra and Nehemiah, with some final editing, somewhat later, in the Ptolemaic period, c. 300–200 BCE.

Chronicles

Chronicles is an anonymous work from Levitical circles in Jerusalem, probably composed in the late 4th century BCE. Although the book is divided into two parts (1st and 2nd Chronicles), the majority of studies propose a single underlying text with lengthy later additions and amendments to underline certain interests such as the cult or the priesthood.

Deuterocanonicals/Biblical Apocrypha

The Catholic and Orthodox Christian churches include some or all of the following books in their Bibles.

Additions to Daniel

The Greek text of the Book of Daniel contains additions not found in the Hebrew/Aramaic version. All are anonymous. The Prayer of Azariah (one of Daniel's companions) was probably composed around 169/8–165/4, when Antiochus IV was oppressing the Jews. The Song of the Three Holy Children (i.e., the three thrown into the furnace) may have been composed by priestly circles in Jerusalem. Susanna may have been composed around 170–130 BCE in the context of the Hellenisation struggle. Bel and the Dragon is difficult to date, but the late 6th century is possible.

1 & 2 Esdras

Jerome's translation of the Bible into Latin (the Vulgate) contained four books of Esdras (i.e. Ezra); Jerome's 1 and 2 Esdras were eventually renamed Ezra and Nehemiah; the remaining books each moved up two places in most versions, but the numbering system remains highly confused. The present 1 Esdras takes material from the Book of Chronicles and the Book of Ezra, but ignores Nehemiah entirely; it was probably composed in the period 200–100 BCE. 2 Esdras has no connection with the other Esdras books beyond taking Ezra as its central character. It was probably written soon after the destruction of the Temple by the Romans in 70 CE.

Book of Baruch
The author of the Book of Baruch is traditionally held to be Baruch the companion of Jeremiah, but this is considered unlikely. Some scholars propose that it was written during or shortly after the period of the Maccabees.

1, 2, 3 & 4 Maccabees

The anonymous author of 1 Maccabees was an educated Jew and a serious historian; a date around 100 BCE is most likely. 2 Maccabees is a revised and condensed version of a work by an otherwise unknown author called Jason of Cyrene, plus passages by the anonymous editor who made the condensation (called "the Epitomist"). Jason most probably wrote in the mid to late 2nd century BCE, and the Epitomist before 63 BCE. 3 Maccabees concerns itself with the Jewish community in Egypt a half-century before the revolt, suggesting that the author was an Egyptian Jew, and probably a native of Alexandria. A date of c. 100–75 BCE is "very probable". 4 Maccabees was probably composed in the middle half of the 1st century CE, by a Jew living in Syria or Asia Minor.

Letter of Jeremiah

The Letter of Jeremiah is not by Jeremiah; the author apparently appropriated the name of the prophet to lend authority to his composition. Nor is it by Jeremiah's secretary Baruch, although it appears as the last chapter of Baruch in the Catholic Bible and the KJV. Internal evidence points to a date around 317 BCE, with the author possibly a Jew in Palestine addressing Jews of the diaspora.

Prayer of Manasseh
The Prayer of Manasseh presents itself as a prayer from the wicked, but now penitent, king Manasseh (or Manassas) from his exile in Babylon. The actual author is unknown, and the date of composition is probably the 2nd or 1st centuries BCE.

Wisdom of Sirach and Wisdom of Solomon

Sirach names its author as Jesus ben Sirach. He was probably a scribe, offering instruction to the youth of Jerusalem. His grandson's preface to the Greek translation helps date the work to the first quarter of the 2nd century BCE, probably between 196 BCE and the beginning of the oppression of the Jews by Antiochus IV, who reigned 175–164 BCE. The Wisdom of Solomon is unlikely to be earlier than the 2nd century BCE, and probably dates from 100 to 50 BCE. Its self-attribution to Solomon was questioned even in the medieval period, and it shows affinities with the Egyptian Jewish community and with Pharisee teachings.

Additions to Esther

The Book of Esther itself was composed probably around 400 BCE by Jews living in the eastern provinces of the Persian empire and reached its final form by the 2nd century BCE; concerns over the legitimacy of certain passages in the Hebrew text led to the identification of the additions to Esther in the Greek translation of Esther of the late 2nd or early 1st century BCE.

Tobit

Tobit is set in the 8th century BCE and is named after its central character, a pious Jew in exile. The generally recognised date of composition is the early 2nd century BCE.

Judith
The Book of Judith is set in Israel in the time of Nebuchadrezzar, king of Assyria. It has strong Persian elements, which suggests a 4th-century BCE date; it also has strong parallels with the Hasmonean period, which suggests a 2nd-century date. It is typically labeled Pharisaic, but an origin in Sadducee circles has also been suggested.

Additional Psalms

The canonical Psalms contains 150 entries. Psalm 151 is found in most Greek translations, and the Hebrew version was found among the Dead Sea Scrolls. Psalms 152–155 are part of the Syriac Peshitta Bible, some of which were found at Qumran.

New Testament

Gospels and Acts
The gospels (and Acts) are anonymous, in that none of them provide the name of the author within their text. While the Gospel of John might be considered somewhat of an exception, because the author refers to himself as "the disciple Jesus loved" and claims to be a member of Jesus' inner circle, most scholars today consider this passage to be an interpolation (see below).

There is general agreement among scholars that the Synoptic Gospels (Matthew, Mark and Luke) show a high level of cross-reference. The usual explanation, the Two-source hypothesis, is that Mark was written first and that the authors of Matthew and Luke relied on Mark and the hypothetical Q document. Scholars agree that the Gospel of John was written last, using a different tradition and body of testimony. In addition, most scholars agree that the author of Luke also wrote the Acts of the Apostles, making Luke-Acts two halves of a single work.

Mark
According to tradition and early church fathers, first attested by Papias of Hierapolis, the author is Mark the Evangelist, the companion of the apostle Peter. The gospel, however, appears to rely on several underlying sources, varying in form and in theology, which tells against the tradition that the gospel was based on Peter's preaching. Various elements within the gospel, including the importance of the authority of Peter and the broadness of the basic theology, suggest that the author wrote in Syria or Palestine for a non-Jewish Christian community which had earlier absorbed the influence of pre-Pauline beliefs and then developed them further independent of Paul.

Matthew
Early Christian tradition, first attested by Papias of Hierapolis, held that the Gospel of Matthew was written in "Hebrew" (Aramaic, the language of Judea) by the apostle Matthew, the tax-collector and disciple of Jesus, but according to the majority of modern scholars it is unlikely that this Gospel was written by an eyewitness. Modern scholars interpret the tradition to mean that Papias, writing about 125–150 CE, believed that Matthew had made a collection of the sayings of Jesus. Papias's description does not correspond well with what is known of the gospel: it was most probably written in Greek, not Aramaic or Hebrew, it depends on the Greek Gospel of Mark and on the hypothetical Q document, and it is not a collection of sayings. Although the identity of the author is unknown, the internal evidence of the Gospel suggests that he was an ethnic Jewish male scribe from a Hellenised city, possibly Antioch in Syria, and that he wrote between 70 and 100 CE using a variety of oral traditions and written sources about Jesus.

Luke and Acts

There is general acceptance that the Gospel of Luke and the Acts of the Apostles originated as a two-volume work by a single author addressed to an otherwise unknown individual named Theophilus. This author was an "amateur Hellenistic historian" versed in Greek rhetoric, that being the standard training for historians in the ancient world.

According to tradition, first attested by Irenaeus, the author was Luke the Evangelist, the companion of the Apostle Paul, but many modern scholars have expressed doubt and opinion on the subject is evenly divided. Instead, they believe Luke-Acts was written by an anonymous Christian author who may not have been an eyewitness to any of the events recorded within the text. Some of the evidence cited comes from the text of Luke-Acts itself. In the preface to Luke, the author refers to having eyewitness testimony "handed down to us" and to having undertaken a "careful investigation", but the author does not mention his own name or explicitly claim to be an eyewitness to any of the events, except for the we passages. And in the we passages, the narrative is written in the first person plural— the author never refers to himself as "I" or "me". To those who are skeptical of an eyewitness author, the we passages are usually regarded as fragments of a second document, part of some earlier account, which was later incorporated into Acts by the later author of Luke-Acts, or simply a Greek rhetorical device used for sea voyages.

John
John 21:24 identifies the author of the Gospel of John as "the beloved disciple," and from the late 2nd century tradition, first attested by Irenaeus, this figure, unnamed in the Gospel itself, was identified with John the son of Zebedee. Today, however, most scholars agree that John 21 is an appendix to the Gospel, which originally ended at John 20:30–31. The majority of scholars date the Gospel of John to c. 80–95, and propose that the author made use of two major sources, a "Signs" source (a collection of seven miracle stories) and a "Discourse" source.

Epistles

Pauline epistles

The Epistle to the Romans, First Corinthians and Second Corinthians, Galatians, Philippians, 1 Thessalonians and the Epistle to Philemon are almost universally accepted as the work of Paul – the superscripts to all except Romans and Galatians identify these as coming from Paul and at least one other person, a practice which was not usual in letters of the period, and it is not clear what role these other persons had in their composition. There is some support for Paul's authorship of the three "Deutero-Pauline Epistles," Ephesians, Colossians, and 2 Thessalonians. The three Pastoral epistles – First and Second Timothy and Titus, are probably from the same author, but most historical-critical scholars regard them as the work of someone other than Paul.

Letter to the Hebrews
The Church included the Letter to the Hebrews as the fourteenth letter of Paul until the Reformation. Pauline authorship is now generally rejected, and the real author is unknown.

General epistles

The traditional authors are: Peter the apostle (First and Second Peter); the author of the Gospel of John (First, Second and Third John), writing in advanced age; "Jude, a servant of Jesus Christ and a brother of James" (Epistle of Jude); and James the Just, "a servant of God and of the Lord Jesus Christ" (James). In fact 1 John is anonymous, and 2 and 3 John identify their author only as "the Elder." Though 2 Peter states its author as "Simon Peter, a servant and apostle of Jesus Christ", most scholars today regard this as pseudonymous, and many hold the same opinion of James, 1 Peter and Jude.

Revelation

The author of the Book of Revelation was traditionally believed to be the same person as both John, the apostle of Jesus and John the Evangelist, the traditional author of the Fourth Gospel – the tradition can be traced to Justin Martyr, writing in the early 2nd century. Most biblical scholars now believe that these were separate individuals. The name "John" suggests that the author was a Christian of Jewish descent, and although he never explicitly identifies himself as a prophet it is likely that he belonged to a group of Christian prophets and was known as such to members of the churches in Asia Minor. Since the 2nd century the author has been identified with one of the Twelve Apostles of Jesus. This is commonly linked with an assumption that the same author wrote the Gospel of John. Others, however, have argued that the author could have been John the Elder of Ephesus, a view which depends on whether a tradition cited by Eusebius was referring to someone other than the apostle. The precise identity of "John" therefore remains unknown.

See also

 Authorship of the Johannine works
 Authorship of the Petrine epistles
 Books of the Bible
 Dating the Bible

References

Citations

Bibliography 
 
 
 
 
 
 
 
 

 
 William David Davies, Steven T. Katz, Louis Finkelstein, "The Cambridge History of Judaism: The late Roman-Rabbinic period" (Cambridge University Press, 2006)
 Brueggemann, Walter, "Reverberations of faith: a theological handbook of Old Testament themes" (Westminster John Knox, 2002)
 Graham, M.P, and McKenzie, Steven L., "The Hebrew Bible today: an introduction to critical issues" (Westminster John Knox Press, 1998)
 Mays, James Luther, Petersen, David L., Richards, Kent Harold, "Old Testament Interpretation" (T&T Clark, 1995)

Pentateuch 
 Ska, Jean-Louis, "Introduction to reading the Pentateuch" (Eisenbrauns, 2006)

Deuteronomistic history 
 de Moor, Johannes Cornelis, and Van Rooy, H. F. (eds), "Past, present, future: the Deuteronomistic history and the prophets" (Brill, 2000)
 Albertz, Rainer (ed) "Israel in exile: the history and literature of the sixth century B.C.E." (Society of Biblical Literature, 2003)
 Romer, Thomas, "The Future of the Deuteronomistic History" (Leuven University Press, 2000)
 Marttila, Marko, "Collective reinterpretation in the Psalms" (Mohr Siebeck, 2006)

Prophets and writings 
 Miller, Patrick D. and Peter W. Flint, (eds) "The book of Psalms: composition and reception" (Brill, 2005)
 Blenkinsopp, Joseph, "A history of prophecy in Israel" (Westminster John Knox, 1996)
 Clemets, R.E., "Jeremiah" (John Knox Press, 1988)
 Allen, Leslie C., "Jeremiah: a commentary" (Westminster John Knox Press, 2008)
 Sweeney, Marvin, "The Twelve Prophets" vol.1 (Liturgical Press, 2000)
 Sweeney, Marvin, "The Twelve Prophets" vol.2 (Liturgical Press, 2000)

New Testament 
  Burkett, Delbert Royce, "An introduction to the New Testament and the origins of Christianity" (Cambridge University Press, 2002)
 Aune, David E., (ed) "The Blackwell companion to the New Testament" (Blackwell Publishing, 2010)
 Mitchell, Margaret Mary, and Young, Frances Margaret, "Cambridge History of Christianity: Origins to Constantine" (Cambridge University Press, 2006)

Further reading
List of Old and New Testament Authors by Tradition and Conjecture
Helms, Ronald McCraw (1996?). Who Wrote the Gospels? First ed. Millennium Press. 

Bible
Documentary hypothesis